Isaac Reed (August 22, 1809 – September 19, 1887) was a United States representative from Maine.

Biography

Reed was born in Waldoboro, Massachusetts (now in Maine) on August 22, 1809, and was the oldest son of Col. Isaac G. Reed. He prepared for college at Bloomfield Academy, but chose to become a merchant-ship builder, rather than attending college, and became the senior partner in the shipbuilding company of Reed, Welt and Co. He also engaged in banking as the "...president of Waldoboro State and National Bank during its entire existence of thirty-two years."

Reed was town clerk of Waldoboro from 1836 to 1838. He served in the Maine State Senate in 1839, 1840, 1850 and 1863. He was a member of the Maine House of Representatives in 1842, 1843 and 1846.

He was appointed as a member of the State board of agriculture and a trustee of the Maine Insane Hospital. He was an unsuccessful candidate for election in 1850 to the Thirty-second Congress, but subsequently was elected as a Whig to the Thirty-second Congress to fill the vacancy caused by the death of Charles Andrews and served from June 25, 1852, to March 3, 1853. He was an unsuccessful candidate for Governor of Maine in 1854 and 1855.

Reed resumed shipbuilding. He served as Maine State Treasurer in 1856. Upon the dissolution of the Whig Party, he became a Democrat. Reed was again elected a member of the Maine House of Representatives in 1870 and 1871.

Reed Mansion
In 1811 Reed's father purchased a house under construction begun in 1808 by the congregational reverend John R. Cutting. Known at the time as "Cuttings folly" the house is now known as the Reed Mansion and is listed on the National Register of Historic Places. In this house was designed and sketched the Seal of Maine.

On April 2, 2017, the Reed Mansion was destroyed by a fire.  The mansion was a complete loss.

Death
Reed died in Waldoboro on September 19, 1887, and is interred at Waldoboro Cemetery.

See also
 Emily Reed (ship)

References

External links 
 
 
 govtrack.us: Rep. Isaac Reed

1809 births
1887 deaths
Maine Democrats
People from Waldoboro, Maine
Members of the Maine House of Representatives
Maine state senators
State treasurers of Maine
Whig Party members of the United States House of Representatives from Maine
19th-century American politicians